Ali Vanomo Bamba (born 2 July 1991) is an Ivorian professional footballer who plays as a left-back for Championnat National 2 club Marignane Gignac CB.

Career
On 19 August 2012, Le Mans announced on its website that Bamba was moving on loan to Belgian Pro League team Oud-Heverlee Leuven. However, two days later, OH Leuven announced that despite the interest in Bamba, they had rejected him after failing the medical tests.

On 4 September 2012, Bamba joined Championnat National side Metz on a loan deal. After his return to Ligue 2, Le Mans, he was released and he returned permanently to Metz, now also in Ligue 2. Bamba played only a few games with the reserve team of Metz and was loaned out in December 2013 to Strasbourg.

References

External links
Player Profile at SO Foot
FC Metz - La fiche de Ali Bamba

1991 births
Living people
People from Bingerville
Association football defenders
Ivorian footballers
Ivorian expatriate footballers
Le Mans FC players
FC Metz players
RC Strasbourg Alsace players
Moulins Yzeure Foot players
SO Cholet players
Marignane Gignac Côte Bleue FC players
Bourges Foot players
Challenger Pro League players
Ligue 2 players
Championnat National players
Championnat National 2 players
Championnat National 3 players
Ivorian expatriate sportspeople in France
Ivorian expatriate sportspeople in Belgium
Expatriate footballers in France
Expatriate footballers in Belgium